Newbridge, Monmouthshire may refer to:

Newbridge, Caerphilly 
Newbridge-on-Usk